Probyn or Probin may refer to the following people:

Given name
Probin Deka (born 1943), Indian politician
Probin Kumar Gogoi, Indian politician
 Probyn Inniss (born 1935), Governor of Saint Kitts and Nevis

Surname
 Major Cyril Probyn Napier Raikes (1875–1963), Military Cross recipient
 Dighton Probyn (1833–1924), English Victoria Cross recipient
Dudley Probyn (1912–2005), Australian rules footballer
Edmund Probyn (1678–1742), British judge
 Elspeth Probyn (born 1958), Australian academic
 Jeff Probyn (born 1956), English international Rugby Union player
Leslie Probyn (1862–1938), an administrator for the British Empire
 May Probyn (1856–1909), English poet
 Siaka Probyn Stevens (1905–1988), president of the Republic of Sierra Leone (1967–1985)

See also 
Probyn-Jones baronets
 5th King Edward's Own Probyn's Horse